West Hampstead is a London Underground station in West Hampstead. It is located on West End Lane between Broadhurst Gardens and Blackburn Road and is situated in Travelcard Zone 2. It is on the Jubilee line between Kilburn and Finchley Road stations. Metropolitan line trains also pass through the station, but do not usually stop.

History
The station was opened on 30 June 1879 by the Metropolitan Railway (now the Metropolitan line) when it extended its tracks from Swiss Cottage. The station acted as the temporary terminus of the branch until it was further extended to Willesden Green on 24 November that year. The original station had two tracks with facing platforms; the booking office was to the south of the current surface building location with separate stairs to each platform. Consequential to the extension of the Great Central Railway displacing the Metropolitan Railway toward the north, this construction was replaced by an island platform overlapping the position of the previous Up platform.

On 20 November 1939, most stopping services were transferred to the Bakerloo line when it took over operations on the Stanmore branch; at this time the platform was rebuilt in the Underground's standard style, but the station building was retained. Stopping services were transferred to the Jubilee line on 1 May 1979. Metropolitan line services run past the station on their own tracks either side of the Jubilee Line having not served the station (a few trains in the early morning and late at night) since the connection between the Metropolitan and Jubilee Lines at Finchley Road was removed as part of the preparation for automatic operation of the Jubilee Line.

Access and interchanges
Due to stairs leading from the ticket hall to the platform, the station is not accessible. Facilities include an automatic ticket machine, two quick ticket machines, a ticket booth, countdown timers, a waiting room and both male and female toilets.

Most maps show the three stations as connections. Through ticketing is allowed.

Development
There have been proposals since before 1990 for a new West Hampstead interchange linking all three stations in the area and additionally serving two further lines that currently pass through the site.
In 2008 it was proposed that the North and West London Light Railway could serve the station.

Image gallery

Connections
London Buses routes 139, 328 and C11 serve the station.

See also
 Stations in West Hampstead

References

Jubilee line stations
London Underground Night Tube stations
Tube stations in the London Borough of Camden
Former Metropolitan Railway stations
Railway stations in Great Britain opened in 1879